Kevoree is an open source project that aims at enabling the development of reconfigurable distributed systems. It is built around a component model, and takes advantage of the Models@Runtime approach to provide efficient tools for the development, live adaptation and synchronization of distributed Software Systems.

History 
The Kevoree project has been initiated by the University of Rennes / IRISA and INRIA Bretagne Atlantique. Started in 2010, Kevoree is now a mature solution to develop distributed software systems.

See also 
 Kevoree Modeling Framework

References

External links 
 
 Kevoree sources on GitHub

Free software